Tomas Johansson (born 20 July 1962) is a Swedish wrestler. He was born in Haparanda. He won an Olympic silver medal in Greco-Roman wrestling in 1992, and a bronze medal in 1988. He won a gold medal at the 1986 World Wrestling Championships Johansson's success is overshadowed in controversy after he was found cheating at the 1984 Los Angeles Olympics. He was disqualified, and stripped of his silver medal and later suspended after testing positive for anabolic steroids.

Olympics

Tomas Johansson made his Olympic debut in Los Angeles in 1984. His aim was a gold medal, stating before the games that wrestling was one of the sports that had been weakened the most by the Olympic boycott. After losing the final to American Jeffrey Blatnick, Johansson claimed a silver medal.  That medal was stripped a couple of days later when it was found that he had tested positive for anabolic steroids. The Swede was banned for 18 months.

In 1988, having won medals in two straight world championships, Johansson was unfortunate to be drawn against the eventual gold medal winner Aleksandr Karelin in the opening match of the Olympic games of Seoul. Johansson lost that bout but went on winning the three next to claim a bronze medal.

During the four next years, leading up to the 1992 Olympics in Barcelona, Tomas Johansson won two more World Championship medals. Every international championship during these years was won by Aleksandr Karelin, so Johansson was fortunate when he was drawn at the opposite side of the Olympic tournament. After an initial tie against Hungarian László Klauz, Johansson won three bouts to reach the gold medal match. Karelin, having won three of his first four games by fall, did this once again, after 93 seconds.

After having won his last World championship medal in 1993, Johansson struggled during the years until the 1996 Olympics. There, he won two of his first four bouts, but losing the other two, thereby reaching a match of 7th and 8th places against Japan's Kenichi Suzuki. Tomas Johansson won this, his final Olympic match, by fall.

References

External links

1962 births
Doping cases in wrestling
Living people
People from Haparanda Municipality
Swedish sportspeople in doping cases
Olympic wrestlers of Sweden
Wrestlers at the 1984 Summer Olympics
Wrestlers at the 1988 Summer Olympics
Wrestlers at the 1992 Summer Olympics
Wrestlers at the 1996 Summer Olympics
Swedish male sport wrestlers
Olympic silver medalists for Sweden
Olympic bronze medalists for Sweden
Olympic medalists in wrestling
Competitors stripped of Summer Olympics medals
World Wrestling Championships medalists
Medalists at the 1992 Summer Olympics
Medalists at the 1988 Summer Olympics
Sportspeople from Norrbotten County